The Roman Catholic Diocese of Bagdogra is a suffragan Latin diocese in the Ecclesiastical province of Calcutta in northeastern India, yet it depends on the missionary Roman Congregation for the Evangelization of Peoples.

Its episcopal see is the Cathedral of the Good Shepherd in the city of Bagdogra, West Bengal.

History 
 Established on 14 June 1997 as Diocese of Bagdogra, on territory split off from the Diocese of Darjeeling.

Statistics 
As per 2014, it pastorally served 55,543 Catholics (5.4% of 1,020,000 total) on 1,200 km² in 19 parishes and 55 missions with 64 priests (29 diocesan, 35 religious), 211 lay religious (46 brothers, 165 sisters) and 14 seminarians.

Episcopal ordinaries
(all Latin Rite) 

Suffragan Bishops of Bagdogra
 Thomas D’Souza (born Idia) (14 June 1997 – 12 March 2011 see below), next Coadjutor Archbishop of Calcutta (India) (2011.03.12 – 2012.02.23), succeeding as Metropolitan Archbishop of Calcutta (2012.02.23 – ...)
Apostolic Administrator Thomas D’Souza (see above 2011.03.12 – 2015.04.07)
 Vincent Aind (born India) (7 April 2015 – ...), no previous prelature.

See also 
 List of Catholic dioceses

References

Sources and external links 
 GCatholic.org, with Google satellite photo - data for all sections 
 Catholic Hierarchy 

Roman Catholic dioceses in India
Christianity in West Bengal
Darjeeling district
Religious organizations established in 1997
Roman Catholic dioceses and prelatures established in the 20th century
Bagdogra